The Women's Printing Society was a British publishing house founded in either 1874 or 1876 by Emma Paterson and Emily Faithfull with the company being officially incorporated as a cooperative in 1878.

Involvement in the suffragist movement 
The company played an important role in British suffrage movement, both through its publication of feminist tracts and in providing employment opportunities for women in a field that had previously been restricted to men.  The house was set up to allow women to learn the trade of printing, and provided an apprenticeship program. Women worked as compositors, and as of 1904, it was one of the few houses where they also did the imposing: ordering the galley proofs so that when folded, the front and back pages aligned properly. As of 1899, the company employed 22 women as compositors. The manager, proof-reader and bookkeeper were also women. Men held the tasks of "pressmen and feeders". The women apprentices earned a wage "considering the hours (9 to 6.30), etc., this is better pay than even highly-educated women can sometimes secure." Some of the initial employees came from Faithful's Victoria Press.

Notable employees 
The Board of Directors included Sarah Prideaux, Mabel Winkworth and Stewart Duckworth Headlam. Elizabeth Yeats studied for a brief time at the Women's Printing Society, before returning to Ireland and starting the Dun Emer Press.

Up to 1893 and between 1889 and 1900, the company published the reports of the Central Committee for the National Society for Women's Suffrage.  It published  the Women's Penny Paper through 1890, but it is not recorded why the relationship ended.

Selected works
Works published by the Women's Printing Society include:
"What is women's suffrage and why do women want it" by Veritas (1883)
A Woman's Plea to Women by Elizabeth Clarke Wolstenholme Elmy (reprint from Macclesfield Courier) (1886)
"Home Politics: An Address" Millicent Garrett Fawcett (1894)
"Swimming and its relation to the Health of Women" Frances Hoggan (1879)
"Education of Girls in Wales" Frances Hoggan (1879)
"Women in India and the Duty of their English Sisters" Mrs. Martindale (1896)
Thomas Wilde Powell Christiana Herringham (1903)
Papers of the Society of Painters in Tempera by Christina Herringham.
Woman Suffrage and the Anti-militants by Ennis Richmond
"Choose, Ye: Darkness or Light!" Lady Melville (1922)
the exhibition catalog of the London International Surrealist Exhibition (1936)

References

Women's suffrage in the United Kingdom
Publishing companies of the United Kingdom
Co-operatives in the United Kingdom